Natoli is a surname. It may refer to:

 Guido Natoli (1893-1966), Italian banker
 Giacomo Natoli (1846-1896), Italian banker and politician
 Giovanni Natoli, Sicilian nobleman
 Giuseppe Natoli (1815-1867), Italian statesman
 Luigi Natoli (1799-1875), Sicilian archbishop
 Piero Natoli (1947–2001), Italian actor, director and screenwriter
 Vincenzo Natoli (1690-1770), Sicilian magistrate